Chi Li (born 30 May 1957) is a contemporary female Chinese writer based in Wuhan. She graduated from department of Chinese literature at Wuhan University in 1986. The setting for some of her stories is Changtangkou in Xiantao, Hubei.

In 2014, she participated in the International Writing Program's Fall Residency at the University of Iowa in Iowa City, IA.

Works
Chi Li has written a number of novels, including the following:
Life Show, a story about the owner of a small restaurant on Jiqing Street in Wuhan.  The book was later made into a movie, also titled Life Show, starring Tao Hong and Tao Zeru.
Comes and Goes, a story of extramarital affairs occurring in Wuhan. TV series of same name starring Pu Cunxin, Lü Liping, Xu Qing, Li Xiaoran.
Don't Talk about Love and The Sun was Born, adapted into TV series Don't Talk about Love. Two antithetical families took totally different attitudes to their children's love.
Good Morning, Lady, adapted to a 20-episode TV series of same name.
Willow Waist
Cold or Hot, It's Good to Live, 1990

References

1957 births
Short story writers from Hubei
Living people
People from Xiantao
Wuhan University alumni
International Writing Program alumni
Chinese women novelists
Chinese women short story writers
20th-century Chinese short story writers
20th-century women writers
People's Republic of China short story writers